San Sebastiano Curone (Piedmontese: San Bastiau Curou ) is a comune (municipality) in the Province of Alessandria in the Italian region Piedmont, located about  southeast of Turin and about  southeast of Alessandria, at the confluence of the Curone and Museglia streams.

San Sebastiano Curone borders the following municipalities: Brignano-Frascata, Dernice, Gremiasco, and Montacuto.

History
Part of the commune of Fabbrica Curone it was under the dominations of the Malaspina and Fieschi from Genoa. In the 16th century, under the Doria, it became an important market centre for salt, fish and cereals.

It is the birthplace of Felice Giani, a neo-classicist painter.

References

Cities and towns in Piedmont